Bailey Nunatak is a nunatak,  high, located along the north flank of White Glacier, midway between Partridge Nunatak and Wilkins Nunatak, near the coast of Marie Byrd Land. It was mapped from U.S. Navy air photos and from United States Geological Survey surveys, 1959–65, and named by the Advisory Committee on Antarctic Names for Andrew M. Bailey, meteorologist at Byrd Station, 1963.

References
 

Nunataks of Marie Byrd Land